Frederick Ferdinand Vanzo (January 8, 1916 – February 1976) was a professional American football player who played running back for four seasons for the Detroit Lions and Chicago Cardinals.

References

1916 births
1976 deaths
American football quarterbacks
American football running backs
Chicago Cardinals players
Detroit Lions players
Northwestern Wildcats football players
People from Vermillion County, Indiana
Players of American football from Indiana